Robert Chua Wah-Peng (born 20 May 1946) is an Asian broadcaster.

Background
Born in 1946 in Colony of Singapore, on 20 May 1946, he has worked internationally in Australia, Hong Kong and China as well.  Among other activities in his career, he was part of the launch of television production company TVB in 1967; the creator of Enjoy Yourself Tonight, the longest-running "live" variety show in Hong Kong; and the founder of satellite television channel of China Entertainment Television (CETV).

References

Further reading

External links

RobertChua.com - Robert Chua's official website
Health and Lifestyle Channel

1954 births
Interactive television producers
Living people
Television executives
Singaporean emigrants to Hong Kong
Singaporean people of Chinese descent